Rear Admiral Charles Peshall Plunkett  (15 February 1864 – 24 March 1931) was an officer of the United States Navy who served in the Spanish–American War and World War I.

Biography

Plunkett was born in Washington, D.C., and was appointed to the Naval Academy in 1879. During the Spanish–American War, he served in Admiral Dewey's Squadron at the Battle of Manila Bay. He commanded both the battleship  and the armored cruiser , and served as Director of Target Practice and Engineering Competitions for the Navy Department before the United States entered World War I.

In July 1918, he designed and oversaw the building and was in command of the five Naval Railway Batteries in France. Under his direction the mobile units of 14-inch battleship guns supported the French and American armies from 6 September until the Armistice, and was awarded the Distinguished Service Medal for his service during the war. Plus the  French legion of honor He later commanded Destroyers, U.S. Atlantic Fleet, and served as Chief of Staff at the Naval War College; as President of the Board of Inspection and Survey; and as Commandant of the New York Navy Yard and the 3rd Naval District.

Retiring in 1928, Rear Admiral Plunkett died in Washington, D.C. on 24 March 1931.

Namesake
The   was named in his honor.

Honors
 Grand Officer of the Military Order of the Tower and Sword, Portugal (3 June 1919)

See also

References

 

1864 births
1931 deaths
United States Navy personnel of World War I
American military personnel of the Spanish–American War
United States Navy admirals
United States Naval Academy alumni
People from Washington, D.C.
Recipients of the Order of the Tower and Sword
Burials at Arlington National Cemetery